The Rabdan Academy is a government-owned education institution in Abu Dhabi, United Arab Emirates.

History
The Rabdan Academy was officially established under Law No. 7 for 2013, issued by President His Highness Sheikh Khalifa bin Zayed Al Nahyan in his capacity as Ruler of Abu Dhabi. It is accredited by the UAE's Commission for Academic Accreditation (CAA) of the Ministry of Education.

Programs
The Rabdan Academy offers programs at the Diploma and Higher Diploma levels and Associate, Bachelor and master's degree levels in the disciples of safety, security, defence, emergency preparedness and crisis management. The people it trains include firefighters.

Initiatives

In 2014, the Rabdan Academy signed Memoranda of Understanding with the General Headquarters of the United Arab Emirates Armed Forces, the Ministry of Interior, and Tawazun Safety, Security and Disaster Management City (Jaheziya) for academic and training support.

The Rabdan Academy is involved in the establishment of the new Zayed Military University and will provide its academic elements.

Notable people
Rabdan Academy's president and CEO is Rear Admiral James Morse, a retired British senior Royal Navy officer who served as Assistant Chief of the Naval Staff (Capability) and Controller of the Navy. He was also the Commandant of the Joint Services Command and Staff College. He became president and CEO of the Rabdan Academy in August 2016. Morse told Gulf News that: "The idea is to prepare young people of the country for the challenges of the future. Not just training them for today, but for the coming four to five years when they have to take charge in intelligence, police and security sectors of the country. So educating young generation is key."

Among its faculty is Joel Hayward, a professor of strategic thought. The daily newspaper Al Khaleej called Hayward "a world authority on international conflict and strategy". The National newspaper called Hayward “eminent” and a “distinguished historian of warfare and military strategy”. Kirkus Reviews said that Hayward "is undeniably one of academia’s most visible Islamic thinkers". He is considered to be one of "the world’s five hundred most influential Muslims," with his listing in the 2023 edition of The Muslim 500 stating that "he weaves together classical Islamic knowledge and methodologies and the source-critical Western historical method to make innovative yet carefully reasoned sense of complex historical issues that are still important in today’s world." Hayward's seventeenth book, The Leadership of Muhammad was awarded the prize of Best International Non-Fiction Book at the 2021 Sharjah International Book Awards.

References

Educational institutions established in 2013
2013 establishments in the United Arab Emirates
Universities and colleges in the Emirate of Abu Dhabi
Universities and colleges in the United Arab Emirates
Education in the United Arab Emirates